Sam Hall (born ) is an English professional rugby league footballer who plays as a  and  for the Castleford Tigers in the Betfred Super League.

He previously spent time on loan from Castleford at the Midlands Hurricanes in Betfred League 1.

He studied at Garforth Academy.

Background 
Hall was born in Leeds, West Yorkshire, England.

Hall played junior rugby league for Oulton Raiders.

Career

Castleford Tigers
On 7 February 2020, Hall made his Super League début for Castleford Tigers (Heritage № 998) against the Wigan Warriors. Weeks later, he signed full-time with the Tigers for 2 years.

Hall signed a 1-year contract extension in October 2021, having made 3 further first-team appearances for Castleford that season.

References

External links
Castleford Tigers profile
SL profile

2002 births
Living people
Castleford Tigers players
Coventry Bears players
English rugby league players
London Broncos players
Rugby league players from Leeds
Rugby league props
Rugby league second-rows